The Nahdlatul Ulama Islamic Institute (abbreviated IAINU) is a private university in the city of Kebumen, Central Java, Indonesia. The university is located in Panjer an area of Kebumen, Central Java.

IAINU has four faculties and graduate programs: faculty of syariah, ushuluddin and da'wah, faculty of Islamic economics and business, faculty of tarbiyah and graduate programs

Faculties
The university have four faculties and graduate program:
Faculty of Syariah, Ushuluddin and Da'wah
Faculty of Islamic Economics and Business
Faculty of Tarbiyah
Graduate Programs

Reference

Kebumen (town)
Universities in Central Java
Private universities and colleges in Indonesia
Buildings and structures in Kebumen Regency